Boyd Hamilton Dowler (born October 18, 1937) is a former professional football player, a wide receiver in the National Football League (NFL). He played 12 seasons from 1959 to 1971, 11 with the Green Bay Packers and one with the Washington Redskins.

Born in Rock Springs, Wyoming, Dowler grew up in Cheyenne, where his father Walter was a high school history teacher, who was also a former football coach who had played college football at Wyoming. Boyd was a three-sport athlete at Cheyenne High School. He played college football at the University of Colorado as a single-wing quarterback under head coach Dal Ward.
Dowler led the Big Seven conference in receiving as a junior in 1957, but spent more time as a passer and runner during his senior season.  While at Colorado, he was a member of Delta Tau Delta fraternity.

The 25th overall pick in the 1959 NFL Draft, Dowler was the NFL rookie of the year in 1959, Vince Lombardi's first season as head coach. Dowler was a two-time Pro Bowler in 1965 and 1967, and a key contributor on the Packers dynasty in the 1960s, assisting the team to five NFL championship wins and victories in Super Bowls I and II.

A late hit by Dallas Cowboys defensive back Mike Gaechter in the end zone following a third quarter touchdown catch resulted in a shoulder injury in the 1966 NFL Championship Game. Dowler aggravated the shoulder early in the first quarter of the first Super Bowl two weeks later, allowing seldom-used Max McGee to be a significant contributor in the game with two touchdown catches. Dowler made a big impact the following year in Super Bowl II with a 62-yard touchdown reception from quarterback Bart Starr in the first half. He finished the game as the top receiver for the Packers, with two receptions for 71 yards and a touchdown.  Dowler is a member of the Green Bay Packers Hall of Fame and the NFL 1960s All-Decade Team.

After eleven seasons with the Packers ending in 1969, Dowler played one year for the Washington Redskins in 1971. He had been acquired from the Packers for the Redskins' 1971 fifth-round pick (124th overall–Jim Stillwagon) which had been obtained from the Los Angeles Rams earlier on January 28, 1971. Dowler was on George Allen's coaching staff with the Rams in 1970 and made the transition with him to Washington as a player-coach.

Dowler retired with a career record of 474 receptions for 7,270 yards and 40 touchdowns. He led the Packers in receptions for seven seasons.

Following his playing career, Dowler spent over 30 years working as an assistant coach and scout in the NFL. Notable positions that Dowler held included the passing game coordinator role for the Philadelphia Eagles from 1973-1975 and, his final stop, a scout for the Atlanta Falcons. Dowler retired as a scout in 2007.

References

External links
 University of Colorado Athletics Hall of Fame – Boyd Dowler
 
 Sports Reference – college football statistics – Boyd Dowler
 

1937 births
Living people
People from Rock Springs, Wyoming
Sportspeople from Cheyenne, Wyoming
Players of American football from Wyoming
American football punters
American football wide receivers
Cheyenne Central High School alumni
Colorado Buffaloes football players
Green Bay Packers players
Washington Redskins players
Western Conference Pro Bowl players
Coaches of American football from Wyoming
Los Angeles Rams coaches
Washington Redskins coaches
Philadelphia Eagles coaches
Cincinnati Bengals coaches
Tampa Bay Buccaneers coaches